Angelo Cereser (born 6 April 1944) is a former Italian professional footballer who played as a defender.

Career
In his youth, Cereser played for San Donà. With San San Donà, he debuted in Serie D, making 12 appearances in two seasons.

In 1962, he was bought by Torino, where he spent most of his career. During his ten seasons at Torino, he played a total of 311 games, scoring 5 goals, and winning two Coppa Italia. In 2021, he was inducted into Torino F.C. Hall of Fame.

He ended his career at Bologna in 1979.

Honours

Player

Torino
Coppa Italia: 1967–68, 1970–71

Individual 
Torino F.C. Hall of Fame: 2021

References

External links
 

Living people
1944 births
Italian footballers
Torino F.C. players
Bologna F.C. 1909
Association football defenders